The 1992–93 FIBA Women's European Champions Cup was the 35th edition of the competition. It was won by defending champion Popular Basquet Godella beating Ginnastica Comense in the final. MBK Ružomberok and Challes Savoie Basket also reached the Final Four, with the Slovaks ranking third.

Competition results

1st Preliminary Round

|}

2nd Preliminary Round

|}

3rd Preliminary Round

|}

Semi-final Round

Final Four

References

Champions Cup
EuroLeague Women seasons